Past and current governments of Afghanistan have included a minister of Haj and Religious Affairs , in their Cabinet. The Current Acting Minister of Haj and Religious Affairs is Noor Mohammad Saqib.

The Ministry
The Ministry of Haj and Religious Affairs is the key ministry responsible for addressing religious affairs in Afghanistan. Responsibilities for the Ministry include: sending Afghan Haji (pilgrims) for the performance of Haj to Saudi Arabia; sending mu’tamir (for the performance of Umrah Haj) through private tourism companies; collecting endowment-related revenues and submitting them to the government in a specific bank account; identification and acquisition of endowment-related property; providing girls and boys with Islamic teachings in the mosques and holy places; co-ordinating Qaris- and Hafiz-related affairs and ensuring cultural and publicity affairs; Khanqas; ensuring diplomatic relations with embassies and with Islamic welfare organisations around the globe through Ministry of Foreign Affairs; issuance of Fatwas and testing of Imams and preachers; better co-ordinating of preaching affairs through mosques and Takia khana; convening religious meetings and ceremonies; and raising public awareness on religious issues at the national and sub national level. The Ministry issues the Payam-e-Haq newsletter and oversees the work of the Islamic Studies Research Centre.

The Ministers

References

https://web.archive.org/web/20141222095313/http://president.gov.af/fa/news/39289

External links

Hajj and Religious Affairs
Hajj
Afghanistan, Hajj and Religious Affairs